The following is the list of squads that took place in the men's field hockey tournament at the 1956 Summer Olympics.

Group A

Afghanistan
The following players represented Afghanistan:

 Abdul Kadir Nuristani
 Din Mohammad Nuristani
 Ghazi Salah-ud-Din
 Jahan Gulam Nuristani
 Bakhteyar Gulam Mangal
 Mohammad Amin Nuristani
 Najam Yahya
 Khan Nasrullah Totakhail
 Noor Ullah Nuristani
 Ramazan Nuristani
 Mohammad Anis Sherzai
 Ahmad Shah Abouwi

India
The following players represented India:

 Shankar Laxman
 Bakshish Singh
 Randhir Singh Gentle
 Leslie Claudius
 Amir Kumar
 Govind Perumal
 Charles Stephen
 Gurdev Singh
 Balbir Singh Sr.
 Udham Singh
 Raghbir Singh Bhola
 Ranganathan Francis
 Amit Singh Bakshi
 Hari Pal Kaushik
 Hardyal Singh
 Raghbir Lal
 Balkrishan Singh

Singapore
The following players represented Singapore:

 Arumugam Vijiaratnam
 Burdett Coutts
 Edwin Doraisamy
 Fred Fernandez
 Dollah Hamid
 Chai Hon Yam
 Michael Wright
 Osbert de Rozario
 Percy Pennefather
 Rudy Mosbergen
 Sinnadurai Vellupillai
 Vellupillai Devadas
 Bill Hay
 Ajit Singh Gill
 S. Jeyathurai
 Richard Schoon
 Roy Sharma

United States
The following players represented the United States:

 Newbold Black
 Henry Clifford
 Stan Harris
 James Jongeneel
 Gerrit Kruize
 Tjerk Leegstra
 Harry Marcoplos
 Kurt Orban
 John Rote
 Walter Stude
 Felix Ucko
 Kurt Ucko
 Ray Wittelsberger

Group B

Australia
The following players represented Australia:

 Ian Dick
 Mel Pearce
 Gordon Pearce
 Eric Pearce
 Maurice Foley
 Ray Whiteside
 Brian Booth
 Glen Jobson
 Keith Leeson
 Kenneth Clarke
 Don Mecklem
 Kevin Carton
 Dennis Kemp
 Desmond Spackman
 Alan Barblett
 Geoff Bennett
 John Dwyer
 Louis Hailey

Great Britain
The following players represented Great Britain:

 David Archer
 Denys Carnill
 John Conroy
 Geoffrey Cutter
 Colin Dale
 Howard Davis
 Michael Doughty
 Neil Forster
 Steven Johnson
 Anthony Robinson
 Frederick Scott
 John Strover
 David Thomas
 John Cockett

Kenya
The following players represented Kenya:

 Roland Frank
 Anthony Vaz
 Balbir Singh Sidhu
 Peter Dalgado
 Surjeet Singh Deol
 Tejinder Singh Rao
 Gursaran Singh Sehmi
 Tejparkash Singh Brar
 Reynold D'Souza
 Hardev Singh Kular
 Alu Mendonca
 Michael Pereira
 Bill Plenderleith
 Dudley Coulson

Malaya
The following players represented Malaya:

 Supaat Nadarajah
 Manikam Shanmuganathan
 Chuah Eng Cheng
 Philip Sankey
 Mike Shepherdson
 Gerry Toft
 Salam Devendran
 Chua Eng Kim
 Thomas Lawrence
 Aman Ullah Karim
 Sheikh Ali
 Hamzah Shamsuddin
 Peter van Huizen
 Freddy Vias
 Rajaratnam Selvanayagam
 Gian Singh
 Noel Arul

Group C

Belgium
The following players represented Belgium:

 André Carbonnelle
 André Muschs
 Franz Lorette
 Jacques Vanderstappen
 Jean Dubois
 Jean-Jacques Enderle
 Jean Van Leer
 Jean-Pierre Rensburg
 Luc Decrop
 Roger Goossens
 Roger Paternoster
 Yvan Freedman

New Zealand
The following players represented New Zealand:

 Archie Currie
 Brian Johnston
 Bruce Turner
 David Goldsmith
 Guy McGregor
 Ivan Armstrong
 John Abrams
 Jack Tynan
 Murray Loudon
 Noel Hobson
 Phil Bygrave
 Reginald Johansson
 Bill Schaefer
 Keith Cumberpatch

Pakistan
The following players represented Pakistan:

 Zakir Hussain
 Munir Ahmed Dar
 Ghulam Rasool
 Anwar Ahmed Khan
 Qazi Massarrat Hussain
 Noor Alam
 Abdul Hamid
 Habibur Rehman
 Ahmed Naseer Bunda
 Motiullah
 Latif-ur Rehman
 Akhtar Hussain
 Habib Ali Kiddie
 Manzoor Hussain Atif

United Team of Germany
The following players represented the United Team of Germany:

 Alfred Lücker
 Helmut Nonn
 Günther Ullerich
 Günther Brennecke
 Werner Delmes
 Eberhard Ferstl
 Hugo Dollheiser
 Heinz Radzikowski
 Wolfgang Nonn
 Hugo Budinger
 Werner Rosenbaum

References

Squads
1956